Children's Park is a public park along Martin Luther King Jr. Promenade in San Diego, California, in the United States. It was designed by landscape architect Peter Walker, and completed in August 1996 at a cost of $2.8 million.

See also

 List of parks in San Diego

References

External links
 

1996 establishments in California
Parks in San Diego